Yarok is the name of several rural localities in Russia:
Yarok, Novosibirsk Oblast, a settlement under the administrative jurisdiction of the Town of Karasuk in Karasuksky District of Novosibirsk Oblast
Yarok, Tambov Oblast, a selo in Starokazinsky Selsoviet of Michurinsky District in Tambov Oblast